Darin McKay LaHood (born July 5, 1968) is an American attorney and politician who has served as a U.S. representative from Illinois since 2015. A member of the Republican Party, LaHood has represented the 16th district since 2023, and previously represented the 18th district from 2015 to 2023. He previously served in the Illinois Senate from the 37th legislative district from 2011 to 2015, when he was elected to congress in a September special election.

A native of Peoria, Illinois, LaHood is the son of Ray LaHood, the 16th United States Secretary of Transportation and before that a seven-term U.S. representative for the district his son now represents. He has called himself a fiscal conservative focused on budget issues. While Ray was a moderate Republican, Darin is considered more conservative.

During the 2022 redistricting process, the 18th congressional district was eliminated as Illinois lost a seat in the apportionment process. After new district boundaries were adopted, LaHood opted to run in the 16th congressional district.

Early life
LaHood was born in Peoria, Illinois, to Kathy (Dunk) and Ray LaHood, the eldest of four siblings, and went to Academy of Our Lady/Spalding Institute. He graduated from Loras College in Iowa and received his Juris Doctor from John Marshall Law School. His father is of Lebanese and German descent.

Career as an attorney 
LaHood was a prosecutor in the Tazewell County state's attorney's office and the United States Attorney's Office for the District of Nevada in Las Vegas. On returning to Peoria in 2005, he took up private law practice;  he is in the Peoria law firm of Miller, Hall & Triggs.

Early political career
LaHood ran for Peoria County state's attorney in 2008, losing to incumbent Kevin Lyons, 43,208 votes to 36,449. He was also involved in several other Republican campaigns, including Bill Brady's 2010 campaign for governor and Dan Rutherford's campaign for Illinois Treasurer.

LaHood was appointed to the Illinois Senate on February 27, 2011, at age 42. He took office on March 1, the day after Dale Risinger retired. When appointed, LaHood announced he would run for election to a full term in 2012, which he won, running unopposed.

U.S. House of Representatives

Elections
2015 special

On July 7, 2015, LaHood defeated Mike Flynn 69%–28%, in the Republican primary for Illinois's 18th congressional district, replacing Aaron Schock. He defeated Democratic nominee Rob Mellon in the September 10 special general election by a large margin. He was sworn in by House Speaker John Boehner on September 17, 2015.

2016

In the November 8, 2016, general election, LaHood defeated Democratic nominee Junius Rodriguez, 250,506 votes (72.1%) to 96,770 (27.9%).

2018

In the November 6, 2018, general election, LaHood defeated Rodriguez again, 195,927 votes (67.2%) to 95,486 (32.8%).

2020

In the November 3, 2020, general election, LaHood defeated Democratic nominee George Petrilli, 261,840 votes (70.41%) to 110,039 (29.59%).

Tenure
LaHood serves on the House Ways and Means Committee.

On May 25, 2016, LaHood introduced legislation through the Science, Space, and Technology Committee that approved the Networking and Information Technology Research and Development (NITRD) Modernization Act of 2016. The NITRD Program was originally authorized by the High Performance Computing Act of 1991. NITRD is the federal government's primary research portfolio on transformative high-end computing, high-speed networking, high capacity systems software, cybersecurity, and related advanced information technologies.

LaHood drew criticism from constituents for declining to hold an open town hall during the February 2017 recess. Constituents from across the 18th congressional district gathered in Bloomington Normal and Jacksonville to request a town hall to discuss a variety of issues, including access to health care, immigration laws, and freedom of the press. LaHood spoke to the demonstrators outside the Farm Bureau building in Peoria who had come to push for a town hall, saying: "We live in a democracy. People may not always agree with me and that's why I have to go before voters like I did in November. I was fortunate to receive 72 percent of the vote in that election. But this is part of the process."

LaHood is a member of the Republican Main Street Partnership and the Republican Study Committee.

Legislature
LaHood voted for the Tax Cuts and Jobs Act of 2017. In a letter to the editor in the State Journal Register, he stated that the bill would help his constituents save money and make businesses more competitive globally, including State Farm Insurance, John Deere, and other local businesses.

During the 116th Congress (2019-2020), LaHood cosponsored the Great American Outdoors Act H.R.1957, establishing the National Parks and Public Land Legacy Restoration Fund for priority deferred maintenance projects on federal lands managed by the National Park Service, the Forest Service, the U.S. Fish and Wildlife Service, the Bureau of Land Management, and the Bureau of Indian Education. In FY2021-FY2025, the fund will accrue up to $1.9 billion per year from revenues on federal lands and waters received from oil, gas, coal, or alternative or renewable energy development.

Political positions

Environment 
LaHood believes that humans "play a role" regarding climate change and that there is "no doubt about that." Despite this, he has a 0% lifetime rating from the League of Conservation Voters, indicating consistent votes against environmental causes.

Health care
LaHood opposes "able-bodied working men" from accessing Medicaid. He supports full repeal of the Affordable Care Act. Of single-payer healthcare, LaHood has said he would consider a bill if it was "fiscally sound" and benefited his constituents.

Net neutrality 
LaHood opposes net neutrality and believes that revoking it has "zero effect" on privacy or data collection.

Economic issues
LaHood supports tax reform, specifically of corporate loopholes. In April 2017, he said he would not vote for a tax cut bill unless it was "revenue neutral" so it would not add to the deficit. In December, LaHood voted for the Tax Cuts and Jobs Act of 2017, which, according to the Congressional Budget Office, will add $1.414 trillion to the national debt.

Immigration 
LaHood supports immigration reform, including shortening the time that it takes for people to legally enter the United States. He is "100 percent supportive" of increasing the number of people allowed to immigrate to the U.S.

Cannabis 
LaHood has an "F" rating from NORML for his voting history regarding cannabis-related causes. He opposes the legalization of marijuana, even for medicinal purposes. LaHood opposes veterans having access to medical marijuana if recommended by their Veterans Health Administration doctor and if it is legal for medicinal purposes in their state of residence. He believes the legalization of medical marijuana increases its illegal use and abuse by teenagers and that it is addictive.

Donald Trump 
In 2017, LaHood said that President Donald Trump should release his tax returns and would vote in favor of requiring such disclosure if a bill mandating it was presented to the House. Of Trump's visits to Mar-a-Lago, LaHood said that "more business should be conducted in the White House than in Florida." He supported the Special Counsel investigation into Russian interference in the 2016 presidential election.

In December 2020, LaHood was one of 126 Republican members of the House of Representatives to sign an amicus brief in support of Texas v. Pennsylvania, a lawsuit filed at the United States Supreme Court contesting the results of the 2020 presidential election, in which Joe Biden defeated Trump. The Supreme Court declined to hear the case on the basis that Texas lacked standing under Article III of the Constitution to challenge the results of an election held by another state.

On January 6, 2021, a mob of Trump supporters entered the U.S. Capitol Building while Congress was debating the Electoral College certification. LaHood and his staff were among those kept under police lockdown for over four hours. That evening, LaHood voted to certify Biden as the 46th President-elect.

Electoral history

Personal life
LaHood lives in Dunlap, a suburb of Peoria, with his wife Kristen; they married in 2000. They have three children.

See also
 List of Arab and Middle-Eastern Americans in the United States Congress

References

External links

U.S. Representative Darin LaHood official U.S. House website
Campaign website
 

|-

1968 births
21st-century American politicians
American people of German descent
American politicians of Lebanese descent
American prosecutors
Assistant United States Attorneys
Illinois lawyers
Republican Party Illinois state senators
John Marshall Law School (Chicago) alumni
Living people
Loras College alumni
Middle Eastern Christians
Politicians from Peoria, Illinois
Republican Party members of the United States House of Representatives from Illinois
United States congressional aides
University of Nevada, Las Vegas faculty